Jouni Veli Juhani Seistamo (9 November 1939 – 9 January 2022) was a Finnish professional ice hockey player who played for Tappara in the SM-liiga. Seistamo was born in Tampere on 9 November 1939. He was inducted into the Finnish Hockey Hall of Fame in 1986. He also competed at the 1960 Winter Olympics and the 1964 Winter Olympics. Seistamo died in January 2022, at the age of 82.

References

External links

Finnish Hockey Hall of Fame bio

1939 births
2022 deaths
Ice hockey people from Tampere
Ice hockey players at the 1960 Winter Olympics
Ice hockey players at the 1964 Winter Olympics
Olympic ice hockey players of Finland
Tappara players